Parker Peak is a  mountain summit located in the Sierra Nevada mountain range, in Mono County of northern California, United States. It is situated in the Ansel Adams Wilderness, on land managed by Inyo National Forest. The mountain is visible from the June Lake Loop, and from the nearby June Mountain ski area. The peak's name is derived from Parker Creek, which in turn was named after an early settler of Mono County. This geographical feature's name has been officially adopted by the U.S. Board on Geographic Names. The first ascent of the summit was made in 1914 by Norman Clyde.

Climate
According to the Köppen climate classification system, Parker Peak has an alpine climate. Most weather fronts originate in the Pacific Ocean, and travel east toward the Sierra Nevada mountains. As fronts approach, they are forced upward by the peaks, causing them to drop their moisture in the form of rain or snowfall onto the range (orographic lift). Precipitation runoff from this mountain drains into headwaters of Parker and Alger Creeks, both of which are tributaries of Rush Creek.

Gallery

See also
 
 Geology of the Yosemite area
 Mount Wood

References

External links
 Weather forecast: Parker Peak

Mountains of Mono County, California
Mountains of the Ansel Adams Wilderness
North American 3000 m summits
Mountains of Northern California
Sierra Nevada (United States)
Inyo National Forest